Stephen Hale is a British charity worker.

Stephen or Steven Hale may also refer to:

Stephen F. Hale (1818–1862), American politician and military officer
Stephen Hale (bishop), Australian bishop, Assistant Bishop of the Eastern Region in the Anglican Diocese of Melbourne (2001–2009)
Steven Hale, British orienteering competitor
Steve Hale, character from the American television sitcom Full House (1987–1995)

See also

Stephen Hales (disambiguation)